Sun Capital Partners, Inc., is an American private equity firm specializing in leveraged buyouts. Sun Capital was founded in 1995 by Marc J. Leder and Rodger Krouse, former classmates at the Wharton School of the University of Pennsylvania and  investment bankers at Lehman Brothers.

As of March 31, 2021, Sun Capital has approximately $13 billion of cumulative capital commitments and has invested in more than 475  portfolio companies worldwide with  revenues in excess of $50 billion across a broad range of  industries, including  business services,  technology,  healthcare, paper and packaging,  building products, general  consumer, and  industrial, among others. Sun Capital is headquartered in Boca Raton, Florida, with additional offices in New York City and Los Angeles, and an  affiliate with offices in London.

Sun Capital's investment strategy involves a variety of proprietary  operational tools to help  portfolio companies grow revenue, lower  costs, improve company  cultures, and enhance  processes. Sun Capital targets  platform companies with  revenues between $50 million and $1.0 billion as well  add-on acquisitions. Sun Capital focuses on several  transaction types, including  corporate carve-outs,  founder-owned, and  sponsor-to-sponsor.

History

In 2014, Private Equity International and Privcap reported that Sun Capital stood to return 9-times its investment in Emerald Performance Materials after more than tripling the portfolio company's earnings in its six years under Sun's stewardship. Sun Capital originally formed Emerald through a corporate carveout of food ingredients and industrial specialties divisions of Lubrizol.

In 2015, Sun Capital sold Point Blank Enterprises after helping the portfolio company grow revenue by adding new products and tripling exports. Sun's sale of Point Blank was subsequently deemed "Turnaround Deal of the Year" by Buyouts Insider. Sun Capital originally assembled Point Blank's assets through bankruptcy auction processes.

In 2016, The Wall Street Journal reported that Sun Capital had returned more than 18-times its investment in Critical Flow Solutions, after more than doubling the portfolio company's earnings in less than two years. Sun originally formed Critical Flow in 2015 in a corporate carveout of three business units from Curtiss-Wright Corporation. The Wall Street Journal subsequently reported that Sun Capital's sale of Admiral Petroleum Co. and Lemmen Oil Co. returned 1,530 times Sun Capital's original investment.

In 2017,  PitchBook highlighted Sun Capital Partners VI as one of the top six performing billion-dollar US buyout funds in the prior five years, with an internal rate of return of 65.1%.  PitchBook subsequently reported that Sun Capital had sold Aclara Technologies for $1.1 billion  after acquiring the smart infrastructure systems provider for $130 million in 2014, sponsoring four add-on acquisitions, and helping quadruple earnings during the investment period.

In 2018, The Wall Street Journal reported that "Sun Capital cashes in again on manufacturing with Robertshaw Sale" after Sun helped the appliance components manufacturer more than double earnings over a four-year period and sell for approximately $900 million.

In 2019, PE Hub reported that Sun Capital had sold Horizon Group Holdings after helping the HVAC services company successfully complete ten add-on acquisitions, enter four new markets, and increase headcount by over 800 professionals.

In 2020, PE Hub reported that Sun Capital's investment in ClearChoice Management Services looked like "a clear home run" after helping the dental implant provider approximately double earnings over a three-year period and sell for more than $1.1 billion.

In 2020, Sun Capital celebrated its 25th anniversary.

In 2021, Sun Capital formalized its investment focus on the technology industry.

Select Investments

2003: Sun Capital Partners acquired bagel chain Bruegger's Enterprises and majority share of Mackie Designs.
2005: Sun Capital Partners acquired Creekstone Farms.
2005: Sun Capital Partners acquired Exopack, but following the purchase of additional international companies, the company became Coveris.
2006: Sun Capital completed 33 transactions (both portfolio and add-on acquisitions) among which was Marsh Supermarkets of Indianapolis, Indiana, the owner/operator of 128 supermarkets/food stores, and 400 Village Pantry convenience stores, among other divisions. 
2006: Sun Capital Partners acquired Big 10 Tire Stores.
2006: Sun Capital Partners acquired Del Monte Canada which it then sold it to ConAgra Foods in 2012.  
2007: Sun Capital acquired majority stake in The Limited from L Brands in 2007 and the rest in 2010. They wrote off the investment and closed stores in 2017.
2007 Sun Capital Partners acquired Restaurants Unlimited Inc for an unspecified amount. 
2008: Sun Capital Partners completed 26 transactions including a majority interest in Gordmans, a department store chain headquartered in Omaha, Nebraska.  
2008: Sun Capital Partners acquired Frontier Spinning Mills.
2008: Sun Capital Partners acquired Kellwood.
2008: Sun Capital Partners acquired Neckermann, one of the leading European mail order companies. Sun Capital Partners refused funding the restructuring of Neckermann in 2012, resulting in bankruptcy.
2010: Sun Capital Partners acquired V&D, the largest Dutch warehouse chain that employed 10,000 people. The chain went bankrupt in 2015 when Sun Capital Partners refused to extend additional credit.
2011: Sun Capital completed 33 transactions including an investment in The SCOOTER Store, acquired NextPharma (UK), Polestar UK Print, the Britton Group, Vitro America, Contessa Premium Foods and Scotch and Soda (clothing), an Amsterdam-based clothing manufacturer/retailer and Kobusch-Sengewald, a German-based packaging provider.  Sun Capital has also exited Bruegger's Bagels which was acquired by Groupe Le Duff and Big 10 Tires which was acquired by Pep Boys.
2012: Sun Capital completed 30 transactions including Strauss Innovation, a Germany-based home furnishing and apparel retailer, American Golf UK clothing retailer Bonmarché, CornerStone Research & Development, Certified Power and Elix Polymers. Sun Capital has also exited Thermasys which was acquired by Wellspring Capital Management, Del Monte Canada was sold to ConAgra Foods and Raybestos Powertrain was sold to Monomoy Capital Partners, FRS was sold to Park-Ohio Holdings, Sonneborn was sold to One Equity Partners and Fearmans Pork was sold to Sofina Foods.
2012: Sun Capital acquired S&N Communications.
2013: Sun Capital completed eighteen acquisitions, eight exits and two IPOs. Some transactions include: Johnny Rockets was sold to Sun Capital Partners in 2013. A majority stake in food packaging company Paragon Print and Packaging was also acquired by Sun Capital Partners in 2013.
2014: Sun Capital completed the acquisitions of ADTI, Aclara and Robertshaw.  Sun Capital exited Wabash, Farfield Companies, Certified Power, Cornerstone, Manoir Aerospace, Emerald Performance Materials, DBA Apparel and Chicago Leisure.
2015: Sun Capital completed the acquisitions of Critical Flow Solutions, Flabeg, Flexitech and Flamingo Horticulture. Sun Capital exited Point Blank, VPS, Fazoli's, Vari-Form, Hickory Farms, Polestar and LOUD Technologies, Inc. 
2015: Sun Capital sold Point Blank to JLL Partners.
2016 Sun Capital Partners exited Kellwood Company, Admiral, Critical Flow Solutions and Innocor.
2016: Sun Capital Partners acquired Furniture Factory Outlet (then known as FFO Home).
2017: Sun Capital Partners acquired BWGS, Arrow Tru-Line, Horizon Services,  AMES Taping Tools, and C&K Holdings.
2017: Sun Capital Partners sold Creekstone Farms to Marubeni Corp. and NextPharma to CapVest.
2018: Sun Capital Partners acquired ClearChoice Holdings, Afriflora and ESIM Chemicals.
2018: Sun Capital Partners sold Aclara, Robertshaw, Albéa and Demilec.
2019: Sun Capital Partners sold Horizon Services.
2019: Sun Capital Partners sold Rebecca Taylor and Parker fashion brands to Vince. Sun Capital Partners also owns 75% of Vince. 
2020: Sun Capital sold ClearChoice Dental Implant Center. 
2020: Sun Capital Partners Foundation Donates $300,000 to South Florida Charities
2020: Sun Capital sold FFO Home to Franchise Group.
2021: Sun Capital Formalized Focus on Tech Investment Vertical and Acquires First Tech Deal, Exadel. 
2021: Sun Capital Acquires Century Distribution Systems 
2021: Sun Capital Completes Second Technology Investment, LoanLogics.

References

External links
Sun Capital Partners (Company website)
Sun Capital Partners Yahoo Finance
Sun Capital Partners Google Finance
Sun Capital Partners Hoovers

1995 establishments in Florida
Financial services companies established in 1995
Private equity firms of the United States
Companies based in Boca Raton, Florida
American companies established in 1995